USS R-12 (SS-89) was an R-class coastal and harbor defense submarine of the United States Navy.

Construction
R-12′s keel was laid down by the Fore River Shipbuilding Company of Quincy, Massachusetts, on 28 March 1918. She was launched on 15 August 1919, sponsored by Miss Helen Mack, and commissioned at Boston, Massachusetts, on 23 September 1919.

History
R-12 remained at Boston, Massachusetts until she headed down the coast on 11 March to New London, Connecticut, whence she operated until the end of May. She then continued south to Panama; transited the Panama Canal at the end of June; arrived at San Pedro, Los Angeles, in July; and with the hull classification symbol "SS-89", departed the California coast for Pearl Harbor at the end of August. Arriving on 6 September 1920, she remained in Hawaiian waters, with occasional exercises on the West Coast and off Johnston Island until 1930. On 10 May 1921 R-14 ran out of usable fuel and lost radio communications while searching for the ocean going tug, which was lost as sea en route from Mare Island to Pearl Harbor. The crew stitched together blankets, hammocks and battery deck covers, and then spent 5 days under sail to travel 120 miles back to Hawaii. The CO received a letter of commendation for the crew's innovative actions from his Submarine Division Commander, CDR Chester Nimitz. On 12 December 1930, R-12 got underway for the East Coast and returned to New London, Connecticut, on 9 February 1931. She conducted exercises with Destroyer Squadrons of the Scouting Force into the spring, then following overhaul trained personnel assigned to the Submarine School. On 27 September 1932, she departed New London for Philadelphia, Pennsylvania, where, after decommissioning on 7 December, she joined other R-boats berthed there in the Reserve Fleet.

Some seven and a half years later, on 1 July 1940, R-12 recommissioned in ordinary and shifted to New London to complete activation. Recommissioned in full on 16 October, she sailed for Panama on 10 December, arrived on 23 December, and into October 1941, patrolled the approaches to the Panama Canal. On 31 October, she returned to New London and for the next three months operated off the New England coast. In February 1942, she commenced patrols to the south and for the next year operated primarily from Guantanamo Bay and Key West, Florida. In March and April 1943, she was back at New London, then in May she returned to Key West, Florida, where she trained submariners for the remainder of her career.

Accident and loss
Shortly after noon on 12 June 1943, R-12, while underway to conduct a torpedo practice approach, sounded her last diving alarm. As she completed preparations to dive, the forward battery compartment began to flood. The collision alarm was sounded and a report was made that the forward battery compartment was flooding. Orders were given to blow main ballast, but the sea was faster. In about 15 seconds, R-12 was lost. The commanding officer, one other officer, and three enlisted men were swept from the bridge as the boat sank and were rescued. The subsequent 14-day search involved as many as 14 ships. Forty-two people died. R-12 was stricken from the Naval Vessel Register on 6 July.

Discovery
Sometime before 25 May 2011, an exploration team led by Tim Taylor aboard the expedition vessel RV Tiburon located and documented the wreck of R-12. The reason for her loss remains unknown. In making the discovery, the team deployed a state-of-the-art autonomous underwater robot which collected first ever imagery of the remains of R-12. They are collaborating and sharing their findings with the US Navy. RV Tiburon intends to launch a future expedition to further investigate the possible causes of the sinking, and collect detailed archeological baseline data.
Updated information from the Department of the Navy shows the following:
On 12 June 1943, the R-12 headed out from Key West to practice launching torpedoes. But as the boat prepared to dive, the forward battery compartment began to flood, and the sub sank in 15 seconds, according to a Navy Court of Inquiry.

Memorials
 There is a granite marker in honor of R-12 at the National Submarine Memorial in Groton, Connecticut.
 There is a small monument in honor of R-12 and her crew at the Rhode Island Veterans Cemetery in Exeter, Rhode Island.
 There is a granite marker in honor of "R-12" and her crew at the Pacific Fleet Submarine Memorial Museum in Pearl Harbor, Hawaii.

Awards
American Defense Service Medal with "FLEET" clasp
American Campaign Medal
World War II Victory Medal

References

External links
On Eternal Patrol: USS R-12
r12sub.com R-12 (SS-89) Submarine: Official website of the exploration of the sunken US WWII submarine USS R-12
Ocean explorer discovers 5 sunken WWII subs, giving closure to hundreds of families. Anna Schecter and Rich Schapiro. NBC News.
Loss of R-12, CDR John Alden USN Ret., The Submarine Review, July 2008, Pages 107–119.

United States R-class submarines
World War II submarines of the United States
World War II shipwrecks in the Caribbean Sea
United States submarine accidents
Lost submarines of the United States
Ships built in Quincy, Massachusetts
1919 ships
Maritime incidents in June 1943